Hydrology is the science which studies the water cycle as a whole, hence the water exchanges between soil and atmosphere (precipitation and evaporation) but also between the soil and sub ground (groundwater).

Switzerland has a varied and complex hydrological system. The climate of Switzerland gives precipitation under the form of snow and rain and is also responsible for the evaporation of water into the atmosphere. The altitude and climate allow the formation and maintenance of many glaciers that feed rivers from five major European river catchments, through which water leaves the country and joins the sea.

Switzerland is sometimes called the "water tower of Europe". Water from Switzerland reaches all northern, southern, western and eastern parts of Europe.

Surface water
Surface water flows through a network of nearly 65,000 km of rivers, shared between the basins of five European rivers: the Rhine, the Rhone, the Po, the Danube and the Adige. Thus, the hydrological network of Switzerland brings feeds the North Sea, the Mediterranean Sea (Western Mediterranean and Adriatic Sea) and the Black Sea. Among these five rivers, two have their source in Switzerland, the Rhine and the Rhone. The other three rivers have tributaries that originate in Switzerland. While most of the country drains into the North Sea, most of the basins (3 out of 5) drain into the Mediterranean Sea.

All major lakes of Switzerland are located in the Rhine, Rhone and Po basins. Lakes in the Danube and Adige basins are less than 5 km². All basins except the Adige have glaciers.

Groundwater
Groundwater refers to water located beneath the ground surface, as opposed to surface water that forms lakes and rivers. This is called hydrogeology. The nature and location of the groundwater is defined by the geological nature of the soils. In the mid-twentieth century, knowledge of groundwater in Switzerland suffered from significant gaps. They were partially filled in the 1980s and 1990s, with a national research program.

The geological structure of Switzerland was formed by collision of two tectonic plates, the Eurasian plate to the north and the Adriatic plate to the south. Geologically, the subsoil is very complex and varied with the Alps in the south, the Jura in the northwest and the plateau between them. Large quantities of water are present in the basement of Switzerland, and form a vast network linked to the geological structures. The underground lake of Saint-Léonard, located in Valais, with its 300 m long and 25 m wide is a notable example.

Each year, one hectare of the Swiss plateau filter an average of four million liters of clean groundwater. According to the Federal Office of Environment, the Swiss basement contains about fifty billion m3 of water. Groundwater is by far the main source of drinking water in Switzerland, covering 80% of requirements. Considering other uses (drinking water and industrial water), groundwater covers 58% of requirements.

See also
List of rivers of Switzerland
List of lakes of Switzerland
List of glaciers of Switzerland
List of islands of Switzerland
List of valleys of the Alps
Geography of Switzerland

References

The Hydrology of Switzerland admin.ch

External links
River basins on the Swiss National Map

Hydrology
Geography of Switzerland
Water in Switzerland